Carlos Mier y Terán (born 31 October 1973) is a Mexican alpine skier. He competed in three events at the 1992 Winter Olympics.

References

1973 births
Living people
Mexican male alpine skiers
Olympic alpine skiers of Mexico
Alpine skiers at the 1992 Winter Olympics
Sportspeople from London